Derrygorman is a townland in the civil parish of Aughagower and barony of Murrisk. It is bordered to the north (from east to west) by Drummindoo, and Sheean, to the east by Dooncastle; to the south (from east to west) by Meneen, Ardogommon, and Tonranny; and to the west by Buckwaria and Sheeroe.

References 

Townlands of County Mayo